Dublin Corporation, known by generations of Dubliners simply as The Corpo, is the former name of the city government and its administrative organisation in Dublin since the 1100s.  Significantly re-structured in 1660-1661, even more significantly in 1840, it was modernised on 1 January 2002, as part of a general reform of local government in Ireland, and since then is known as Dublin City Council. This article deals with the history of municipal government in Dublin up to 31 December 2001. 

The long form of its name was The Lord Mayor, Aldermen and Burgesses of the City of Dublin.

History
Dublin Corporation was established under the Anglo-Normans in the reign of Henry II of England in the 12th century.

Two-chamber Corporation

For centuries it was a two-chamber body, made up of an upper house of 24 aldermen, who elected a mayor from their number, and a lower house, known as the "sheriffs and commons", consisting of up to 48 sheriffs peers (former sheriffs) and 96 representatives of guilds.

19th-century reform

The modern Dublin Corporation was restructured by late 19th-century and 20th-century legislation, particularly, the Municipal Corporations (Ireland) Act 1840, with the elected body reduced to a single chamber Dublin City Council, presided over by the Lord Mayor of Dublin, an office first instituted but not filled by King Charles I and reconstituted following the Restoration of the Crown by King Charles II.

Queen Victoria refused to visit Ireland for a number of years, partly in protest at Dublin Corporation's decision not to congratulate her son, Prince Albert Edward, The Prince of Wales, on both his marriage to Princess Alexandra of Denmark and on the birth of the royal couple's oldest son, Prince Albert Victor.

21st-century change of name
On 1 January 2002, following a major reform of local government which also abolished the 300-year-old title of Alderman in the Republic of Ireland and the 700-year-old title of 'town clerk' in Dublin, the name of Dublin Corporation was changed to Dublin City Council, which previously had been used simply to refer to the assembly of elected councillors.  The body had full corporate continuity but there were some boundary and other changes.

See also
 Lord Mayor of Dublin
 City Hall, Dublin
 Mansion House, Dublin
 Guilds of the City of Dublin

References
 Report of the Commission on Municipal Corporations in Ireland (1835) Appendix on Dublin: pp.1–116 and pp.117–311

Local government in County Dublin
History of Dublin (city)
Former local authorities in the Republic of Ireland